Relaxin' with the Miles Davis Quintet is a studio album by the Miles Davis quintet recorded in 1956 and released in March 1958. Two sessions on 11 May 1956 and 26 October in the same year resulted in four albums—this one, Steamin' with the Miles Davis Quintet, Workin' with the Miles Davis Quintet and Cookin' with the Miles Davis Quintet. These four albums are considered to be among the best performances in the whole hard bop subgenre. The album was remastered by Rudy Van Gelder in 2005 for Prestige Records. This album includes dialogue snippets taken from the original master reel. As the title suggests, it also emphasizes Miles Davis' concentrated medium-register ballad playing.

Track listing
Prestige – LP 7129:

Personnel
Miles Davis – trumpet
John Coltrane – tenor saxophone
Red Garland – piano
Paul Chambers – bass
Philly Joe Jones – drums

References

1958 albums
Miles Davis albums
Prestige Records albums
Albums produced by Bob Weinstock
Albums recorded at Van Gelder Studio